As of 2 March 2022 Bosnia and Herzegovina has 21 commercial banks officially registered within the Central Bank of Bosnia and Herzegovina.

Commercial Banks

Other banks

Central banks
 Central Bank of Bosnia and Herzegovina

Defunct banks
These are banks that either lost their licence due to the accumulated debts and insolvency, or went into bankruptcy:

 Banka Srpske - Banja Luka
 Balkan Investment Bank - Banja Luka
 Bobar Banka - Bijeljina
 IEFK Bank - Banja Luka
 Postbank BH - Sarajevo
 Hercegovačka Banka - Mostar
 Camelija banka - Bihać
 International Commercial Bank - Sarajevo 
 VB banka - Banja Luka
 Zepter Komerc bank - Banja Luka
 Privredna banka a.d. - East Sarajevo

Merged banks

 BOR Banka - Sarajevo
 Moja Banka - Sarajevo
 FIMA Banka - Sarajevo
 Volksbank a.d. - Banja Luka
 Volksbank d.d. - Sarajevo
 NLB Tuzlanska Banka - Tuzla
 Tuzlanska banka - Tuzla
 ABS Banka - Sarajevo 
 Depozitna banka - Sarajevo
 Šeh-in banka - Zenica
 Investicijska Banka Federacije BiH - Sarajevo
 LT Gospodarska banka - Sarajevo
 Ljubljanjska banka - Sarajevo
 Sberbank BH - Sarajevo
 Central Profit Banka - Sarajevo
 Universal banka - Sarajevo
 HVB CPB Banka - Sarajevo
 HVB Banka Bosna i Herzegovina - Sarajevo
 Nova Banjalučka banka - Banja Luka
 UPI banka - Sarajevo
 CBS Bank - Sarajevo
 Commercebank - Sarajevo
 Una banka - Bihać
 Auro Banka - Mostar
 Gospodarska banka - Mostar
 Mostarska gospodarska banka - Mostar
 Vakufska banka - Sarajevo
 Sberbank a.d. - Banja Luka

References

Banks
Bosnia
Economy of Bosnia and Herzegovina
Bosnia and Herzgovina